Ademola Onikoyi (born 22 December 1987) is a Nigerian cricketer. He played in the 2013 ICC World Cricket League Division Six tournament. In April 2018, he was named the man of the match in Nigeria's second match of the 2018 ICC World Twenty20 African Sub Regional Qualifier tournament.

In September 2018, he was named in Nigeria's squad for the 2018 Africa T20 Cup. He made his Twenty20 debut for Nigeria in the 2018 Africa T20 Cup on 14 September 2018.

In May 2019, he was named as the captain of Nigeria's squad for the Regional Finals of the 2018–19 ICC T20 World Cup Africa Qualifier tournament in Uganda. He made his Twenty20 International (T20I) debut for Nigeria against Kenya on 20 May 2019. He was the leading run-scorer for Nigeria in the Regional Finals, with 65 runs in three matches. In October 2019, he was named as the captain of Nigeria's squad for the 2019 ICC T20 World Cup Qualifier tournament in the United Arab Emirates. Ahead of the tournament, the International Cricket Council (ICC) named him as the key player in Nigeria's squad.

In October 2021, he was named in Nigeria's squad for the Regional Final of the 2021 ICC Men's T20 World Cup Africa Qualifier tournament in Rwanda.

References

External links
 

1987 births
Living people
Nigerian cricketers
Nigeria Twenty20 International cricketers
Place of birth missing (living people)
People from Lagos State
Sportspeople from Lagos State
Wicket-keepers